Didoko is a town in southern Ivory Coast. It is a sub-prefecture of Divo Department in Lôh-Djiboua Region, Gôh-Djiboua District.

Didoko was a commune until March 2012, when it became one of 1126 communes nationwide that were abolished.

In 2014, the population of the sub-prefecture of Didoko was 21,660.

Villages
The 9 villages of the sub-prefecture of Didoko and their population in 2014 are 21,660.

 Diankro (1 239)
 Didoko (7 071)
 Doubo (1 100)
 Groh1 (305
 Groh2 (1 010)
 Guéhou (1 860)
 Iroporia (3 714)
 Mbazo (610)
 Zéhiri 1 (2 592)

References

Sub-prefectures of Lôh-Djiboua
Former communes of Ivory Coast